is the 22nd studio album by Japanese entertainer Miho Nakayama. Released through King Records on December 4, 2019, it was Nakayama's first studio release in 20 years after her 1999 album Manifesto. The album features four new songs and four self-covers. The first press limited edition release featured a cover painting by Ryōji Arai and a 2020 mini-calendar.

The album peaked at No. 28 on Oricon's albums chart and No. 37 on Billboard Japans Hot Albums chart.

Track listing 
All music is arranged by Ren Takada.

Personnel
 Miho Nakayama – vocals, piano (8)
 Ren Takada – guitar (1–7), programming (1–2, 4–5, 8), backing vocals (1–7), pedal steel guitar (3, 8), ukulele (7), banjo (7)
 Tetsuya Hataya – piano (1–7)
 Wataru Iga – bass (1–7)
 Daichi Ito – drums (1–7)
 Haruna – backing vocals (1–2, 5, 7)

Charts

References

External links
 
 
 

2019 albums
Miho Nakayama albums
Japanese-language albums
King Records (Japan) albums